The Aubette is a 20 km long river of France (Côte-d'Or and Haute-Marne departments), which empties into the Aube near Dancevoir.

References

Rivers of France
Rivers of Aube
Rivers of Grand Est
Rivers of Côte-d'Or
Rivers of Bourgogne-Franche-Comté